Mineral Wells is an unincorporated community located in central DeSoto County, Mississippi, United States, near the Mississippi/Tennessee border just south of Memphis and approximately  north of Olive Branch on Mississippi Highway 178. Mineral Wells is located on the former St. Louis–San Francisco Railway.

A post office operated under the name Mineral Wells from 1910 to 1994.

References

Unincorporated communities in DeSoto County, Mississippi
Unincorporated communities in Mississippi
Memphis metropolitan area